Strategic complexity may refer to:
 an alternative name for the field of Complexity theory and organizations
 the degree of complexity of elements of a strategy
 the number of elements of a strategic activity system, see Competitive Strategy